Aleksandar "Mačka" Dimitrovski (born 8 June 1980) is a former Macedonian professional basketball swingman who last played for Rabotnički. He was also member of North Macedonia national basketball team.

Personal life
On 27 June 2015, Aleksandar married Macedonian pop singer Tamara Todevska.

References

External links
 Aleksandar Dimitrovski at eurobasket.com
 Aleksandar Dimitrovski at basketball.realgm.com
 Aleksandar Dimitrovski at bubabasket.com
 Aleksandar Dimitrovski at fibaeurope.com

1980 births
Living people
Macedonian men's basketball players
People from Gevgelija
Śląsk Wrocław basketball players
Small forwards
Shooting guards